Belinsky is a town and the administrative center of Belinsky District in Penza Oblast, Russia, located at the confluence of the rivers Bolshoy Chembar and Maly Chembar,  west of Penza, the administrative center of the oblast. Population: 

It was previously known as Chembar (until 1948).

History
It was first mentioned in 1713. In 1780, it was granted town status and named Chembar. In 1798, it was abolished, but in 1801 it was re-instated as a town. In 1948, it was renamed after Vissarion Belinsky who spent his childhood here.

Administrative and municipal status
Within the framework of administrative divisions, Belinsky serves as the administrative center of Belinsky District. As an administrative division, it is incorporated within Belinsky District as the town of district significance of Belinsky . As a municipal division, the town of district significance of Belinsky is incorporated within Belinsky Municipal District as Belinsky Urban Settlement.

Notable residents 

Alexander Bychkov (born 1988), serial killer 2009–2012
Miroslav Katětov (1918–1995), Czech mathematician, chess master, and psychologist

References

Notes

Sources

External links
Official website of Belinsky 
Directory of organizations in Belinsky 

Cities and towns in Penza Oblast
Chembarsky Uyezd
Belinsky District